Katumbia is a genus of dicynodont from Late Permian (Changhsingian) Kawinga Formation of Tanzania.

References

Dicynodonts
Permian tetrapods
Fossil taxa described in 2007
Permian animals of Africa
Anomodont genera